Max Unger (born 1986) is an American football player.

Max Unger may also refer to:

 Max Unger (musicologist) (1883–1959), German musicologist
 Max Unger (sculptor) (1854–1918), German sculptor